Mondial is an international auxiliary language created by the Swedish school principal Helge Heimer, in the 1940s. It received favourable reviews from several academic linguists but achieved little practical success. Grammars and dictionaries were published in Swedish, French, English, Italian, and German.

Orthography
Mondial uses 26 letters of the ISO basic Latin alphabet, where k and w only occur in proper nouns and loan words.

k, w occur only in proper nouns and loanwords
q only in qu, and that only before e and i

Grammar

Tonic accent

The tonic accent in Mondial in general falls on the penultimate syllable in words that end in a vowel or s:

 amico, idea, il amara, amicos, ideas, doctores.

on the last syllable in nouns that end with a consonant other than s:

 doctor, general, american.

A diphthong counts as one syllable:

 patria, vidua, patrias, viduas, il amaria.

Exceptions to this show the placing of the tonic accent with an accent:

 veritá, café.

Pronouns

The reflexive, third person singular pronoun (himself, herself, itself) is se. The pronoun su means "her own", "his own" or "its own".

Note that the third person singular possessive is the same for both masculine and neuter (sui). Votre can be used as second person singular possessive as a respectful form.

Verbs

Verbs conjugate as follows, using savar (to know) as an example:

 Infinitive: -ar (savar, to know)
 Present participle: -ante (savante, knowing)
 Past participle: -ate (savate, knew)
 Present: -a (yo sava, I know)
 Imperfect: -avi (yo savavi, I knew)
 Simple future: -ara (yo savara, I will know)
 Present conditional: -aria (yo savaria, I would know)
 Imperative: -a (sava!, know!)
 Imperative plural: -amo (savamo!, let us know!)

Verbs do not conjugate by person: yo, tu, il, nu, vu, li sava (I, you, he, we, you, they know).

Mondial has a single irregular verb, the verb ser (to be):

 Infinitive: ser (to be)
 Present participle: sente (being)
 Past participle: sete (been)
 Present: e (is/am/are)
 Imperfect: evi (was)
 Simple future: sera (will be)
 Present conditional: seria (would be)
 Imperative: se! (be!)
 Imperative plural: semo! (let us be!)

The auxiliary verb har (have) is used in much the same way as English, conjugating in the same way as the above plus the past participle of the main verb:

 har savate (to have known)
 hante savate (having known)
 yo ha savate (I have known) 
 yo havi savate (I had known)
 yo hara savate (I will have known)
 yo haria savate (I would have known)

Passive voice is formed with the auxiliary verb var and the past participle of the main verb:

 yo va savate (I am known)
 yo vavi savate (I was known)
 yo ha vate savate (I have been known)
 yo havi vate savate (I had been known)
 yo vara savate (I will be known)
 yo hara vate savate (I will have been known)
 yo varia savate (I would be known)
 yo haria vate savate (I would have been known)
 va savate! (be known!)
 vamo savate! (let us be known!)
 var savate (to be known)
 har vate savate (to have been known)
 vante savate (being known)
 hante vate savate (having been known)

The verb to be (ser) can be used in the same way as var when no ambiguity arises:

 Il e / va savate da tutes
(He is known by all)

An example of where var and ser cannot be used interchangeably:

 Le porte va uvrate a tri hores
 (The door is opened at three o'clock – passive)

 Le porte e uvrate a tri hores
(The door is open at three o'clock – state of being)

Sample

Translation
Tristan Bernard, the humorist, one day sat with a friend in a first-class carriage to Versailles.  He immediately lit a good cigar, which he began to smoke with visible satisfaction. Then, a gentleman entered and told Tristan Bernard, in an irritating tone, to put out his cigar or to go to another compartment.  No response. The gentleman, becoming angry, repeated his request, but in vain. Beside himself with indignation, he quickly left the compartment and returned several moments later with the conductor.

"This gentleman has nothing to say here," said Tristan Bernard then; "he has a second-class ticket, and this is first class." Confused and angry, the passenger had to present his ticket to the conductor and accompany him immediately to a second-class compartment.  When they had gone, Tristan Bernard's friend asked him how he could have known that the other passenger had a second-class ticket.

"It came out of his vest pocket," answered Tristan Bernard, "and I saw that it was the same color as mine."

References

 Pei, Mario. One Language for the World. Devin-Adair, New York: 1958.
 Stenström, Ingvar. "Que pote nos apprender ab le alteres e ab lor experientias de un seculo?" in Ingvar Stenström and Leland Yeager (joint authors), Tema: Interlinguistica e Interlingua, Discursos public. Union Mundial pro Interlingua, Netherlands: 1991. In Interlingua.

External links
Yo parla Mondial" – le blogue in Mondial
Mondial – French dictionary
Grammar of Mondial in English

International auxiliary languages
Constructed languages
Constructed languages introduced in the 1940s